Telestes beoticus, or the paskóviza,  is a species of freshwater fish in the family Cyprinidae.
It is found only in Greece, in the Kifissos and Assopos drainages.
Its natural habitats are rivers, intermittent rivers, and freshwater lakes , and is  threatened by habitat loss.

References

Telestes
Fish described in 1939
Taxonomy articles created by Polbot
Taxa named by Alexander I. Stephanidis